Mae Fa Luang may refer to:
 Mae Fa Luang District
 Mae Fa Luang Subdistrict